Charmed: Season 10 is a comic book series that was published monthly by Zenescope Entertainment, which owns the publishing rights to the Charmed comic book series. Written by Pat Shand and edited by Paul Ruditis, the series was an officially licensed continuation of both the popular television series of the same name, which ended its eight-year run in 2006, and the preceding comic series, Charmed: Season 9 (2010–12).  The first issue debuted at New York Comic Con on October 8, 2014, and continued for 20 issues.

The series narrative followed the Charmed Ones – sisters Piper and Phoebe Halliwell and Paige Matthews – the most powerful good witches in history who use their combined "Power of Three" to protect innocent lives from demonic beings. After being reunited with their elder sister, Prue, who was killed less than a decade earlier, and the former-demon Cole Turner, the Charmed Ones must vanquish demons who threaten the safety of their magic. Its chronology succeeds the events of the eight television seasons, Season 9, and the novel The War on Witches.

Plot

Arc One (Issues 1–6)

Arc Two (Issues 7–12)

Arc Three (Issues 13-20)

Publication

Issues
{| class="wikitable plainrowheaders" style="margin: auto; width: 100%"
|-
!! style="background-color:#401a19; color: #FFF; text-align: center;"|Issue inSeries
!! style="background-color:#401a19; color: #FFF; text-align: center;"|Issue inSeason
!! style="background-color:#401a19; color: #FFF; text-align: center;"|Title
!! style="background-color:#401a19; color: #FFF; text-align: center;"|Written by
!! style="background-color:#401a19; color: #FFF; text-align: center;"|Penciled by
!! style="background-color:#401a19; color: #FFF; text-align: center;"|Original Release Date
|-
! style="background-color: #401a19; " colspan="6"|Season 10: Volume 1
|-

|-
! style="background-color: #2b3e38; " colspan="6"|Season 10: Volume 2
|-

|-
! style="background-color: #e1b840; " colspan="6"|Season 10: Volume 3
|-

|}

Collected editions
The issues are collected into trade paperback by Zenescope Entertainment after each story arc is complete.

References

Charmed (TV series)
2014 comics debuts
Comics based on television series